Hosidius Geta (fl. late 2nd – early 3rd century AD) was a Roman playwright. Tertullian  refers to him as his contemporary in the De Prescriptione Haereticorum.

Geta was the author of a tragedy in 462 verses titled Medea. It is the earliest known example of a Virgilian cento, that is, a poem constructed entirely out of lines and half-lines from the works of Virgil. The poet used Virgilian hexameters for the spoken parts of the play, and half-hexameters for the choral parts.

Bibliography
Text edited by R. Lamacchia, Medea. Cento Vergilianus (Teubner, 1981)
Text, Translation, and Commentary by Maria Teresa Galli [Latin-Italian with English Summaries]. Vertumnus. Berliner Beiträge zur Klassischen Philologie und zu ihren Nachbargebieten, vol. 10, Göttingen: Edition Ruprecht 2017,

Sources
 ancientlibrary.com

Further reading
Scott C. McGill, "Tragic Vergil: rewriting Vergil as a tragedy in the Cento « Medea »," Classical World 95 (2001–2002) 143–161.
N. Dane, "The Medea of Hosidius Geta," Classical Journal 46 (1950) 75–78.
Giovanni Salanitro, "Osidio Geta e la poesia centonaria," ANRW 2.34.3: 2314–2360.
Philip Hardie, "Polyphony or Babel? Hosidius Geta's Medea and the poetics of the cento," in Simon Swain, Stephen Harrison and Jas Elsner (eds), Severan culture (Cambridge, CUP, 2007).

Ancient Roman tragic dramatists
Year of birth unknown
Year of death unknown
Hosidii